Heta is a letter of the Greek alphabet.

Heta may also refer to:
 Cyclone Heta, a tropical storm of 2003–2004
 Heta Station, a railway station in Japan
 Heta River, a river in Russia
 Heta Asset Resolution, an Austrian company
 Damon Heta (born 1987), Australian darts player 
 Heta Stewart (1869–1909), New Zealand rugby union player

See also 
 
 Hetta (disambiguation)
 Kheta (disambiguation)
 Xetá